Wilson is a borough in Northampton County, Pennsylvania. The population was 8,259 at the 2020 census. Wilson is located adjacent to the city of Easton and is part of the Lehigh Valley metropolitan area, which had a population of 861,899 and was the 68th most populous metropolitan area in the U.S. as of the 2020 census.

Geography
There is more than one Wilson in Pennsylvania. This borough is in the far east of Pennsylvania, in Northampton County; the two others are located near Clairton, south of Pittsburgh in Allegheny County, and in Clarion County. Wilson is located at  (40.684648, -75.239626).

History

Wilson Borough is named after former U.S. President Woodrow Wilson. First formed as a township on February 10, 1913 during the first half of 1920, a number of property owners solicited the courts to change the form of government from a township to that of a borough.

Historical controversy
According to the 1920 book, History of the Northampton County [Pennsylvania] and the Grand Valley of Lehigh, by the American Historical Society, supervised and revised by William J. Heller, the township was consummated by the courts in 1914, but the court case of Palmer School District v. Wilson School District indicates the township formation occurred on Feb. 10, 1913.

Early historical court challenges
There are two very early court cases soon after the creation of the new township in 1913. The first was Palmer School District v. Wilson School District where Wilson owed Palmer for a certain amount of indebtedness caused by the creation of the new township. The other was Township of Wilson v. Easton Transit Co. in 1916 in which Wilson leadership sued the transit company for performing work without due consideration to the newly formed township's rights to give permission to do the work. Originally the newly found township lost this case but on appeal to the Supreme Court of Pennsylvania on May 22, 1917 with then Justice Walling ruling, "The assignments of error are overruled and the decree is affirmed at the cost of the appellant."

Demographics

2010 Census
At the 2010 census, there were 7,896 people living in the borough. The racial makeup of the borough was 84.1% White, 6.5% African American, 0.2% Native American, 2.1% Asian, 0.0% Pacific Islander, 3.0% from other races, and 4.1% from two or more races. Hispanic or Latino of any race were 10.6% of the population.

2000 Census
At the 2000 census, there were 7,682 people, 3,164 households and 1,949 families living in the borough. The population density was 6,185.9 per square mile (2,392.0/km2). There were 3,345 housing units at an average density of 2,693.5 per square mile (1,041.5/km2). The racial makeup of the borough was 93.87% White, 1.84% African American, 0.07% Native American, 1.56% Asian, 0.04% Pacific Islander, 1.11% from other races, and 1.52% from two or more races. Hispanic or Latino of any race were 4.05% of the population.

There were 3,164 households, of which 30.0% had children under the age of 18 living with them, 44.2% were married couples living together, 12.8% had a female householder with no husband present, and 38.4% were non-families. 31.7% of all households were made up of individuals, and 13.8% had someone living alone who was 65 years of age or older. The average household size was 2.40 and the average family size was 3.05.

24.9% of the population were under the age of 18, 7.6% from 18 to 24, 31.9% from 25 to 44, 20.1% from 45 to 64, and 15.5% who were 65 years of age or older. The median age was 36 years. For every 100 females there were 91.4 males. For every 100 females age 18 and over, there were 88.0 males.

The median household income was $37,400 and the median family income was $44,707. Males had a median income of $35,870 compared with $26,738 for females. The per capita income for the borough was $18,625. About 4.5% of families and 5.8% of the population were below the poverty line, including 3.8% of those under age 18 and 9.8% of those age 65 or over.

Transportation

U.S. Route 22 and Pennsylvania Route 248 are the numbered highways passing through Wilson. US 22 follows the Lehigh Valley Thruway along a southwest-northeast alignment along the western and northern edges of the borough, with an interchange with PA 248 located just west of the borough in Palmer Township. PA 248 follows Northampton Street along an east-west alignment through the center of the borough.

Public education
The borough is served by the Wilson Area School District. Students in grades nine through 12 attend Wilson Area High School in the district.

References

External links 

Boroughs in Northampton County, Pennsylvania
Boroughs in Pennsylvania
Populated places established in 1860